Hadžići is a town and municipality located in Sarajevo Canton of the Federation of Bosnia and Herzegovina, an entity of Bosnia and Herzegovina. It is located south west of the city of Sarajevo. According to the 2013 census, Hadžići municipality has a population of 23,891 residents and the town had 4,993.

Demographics

1971
18,508 total
11,150 Bosniaks (60.24%)
6,055 Serbs (32.71%)
964 Croats (5.20%)
116 Yugoslavs (0.62%)
223 others (1.23%)

1991
24,200 total
15,399 Bosniaks (63.63%)
6,362 Serbs (26.28%)
746 Croats (3.08%)
841 Yugoslavs (3.47%)
859 others (3.54%)

2013
23,891 total
22,422 Bosniaks(93.85%)
243 Serbs (1.02%)
195 Croats (0.82%)
1,011 others (4.23%)

Settlements

Notable people 

 Hamdo Ejubović (born 1959), Bosnian politician
 Slobodan Princip (1914-1942), Yugoslav Partsian fighter

Twin towns – sister cities

Hadžići is twinned with:

 Hacılar, Turkey
 Meram, Turkey
 Reus, Spain

See also
Sarajevo

References

External links

The official web site of Hadžići municipality Sarajevo (Bosnian)
web portal of Hadžići municipality Sarajevo (Bosnian)

 

Cities and towns in the Federation of Bosnia and Herzegovina
Municipalities of the Sarajevo Canton
Populated places in Hadžići